Parker Kelly (born May 14, 1999) is a Canadian professional ice hockey forward for the  Ottawa Senators of the National Hockey League (NHL).

Early life
Kelly was born on May 14, 1999, in Camrose, Alberta, Canada. His grandfather, Nicolaas Keyzer, was born in the Netherlands before moving his family to Leamington, Ontario.

Playing career

Amateur
Growing up in Alberta, Kelly played Bantam AAA ice hockey with the Camrose Vikings before being drafted in the seventh round of the 2014 Western Hockey League (WHL) Bantam Draft by the Prince Albert Raiders. In his final full season with the Vikings, Kelly had recorded 58 points through 31 games. Following the draft, Kelly attended their training camp but was one of nine players to be returned to their AAA club. He then joined the Sherwood Park Kings and Camrose Kodiaks for the remainder of the 2014–15 season.  

The following season, Kelly joined the Raiders for 68 games where he recorded eight goals and 11 assists for 19 points.  His first career WHL goal came with nine minutes remaining in the third period of a game against the Lethbridge Hurricanes on December 15, 2015. During his rookie season, Kelly was given the moniker "Pesky Parker Kelly" due to his scrappy style of play. He finished the year with two team awards; Rookie of the Year and Scholastic Player of the Year. He returned to the Raiders for his sophomore season, where he improved his offensive output and collected 22 goals and 43 points. In spite of his success, the team failed to qualify for the 2017 WHL playoffs and ranked third-last leaguewide.

Kelly concluded his third season with the Raiders with 21 goals and 43 points in 72 games. On September 19, 2017, Kelly signed a three-year entry-level contract with the Ottawa Senators.

Professional
After signing with the Senators organization, Kelly joined the Belleville Senators, the Senators' American Hockey League (AHL) affiliate for five games. He spent the 2018–19 season with the Raiders before joining Belleville for the 2019–20 season. Kelly scored ten goals and six assists for 16 points in 57 games. Kelly was again assigned to Belleville for the 2020–21 season. Kelly scored 18 points in 33 games with Belleville.

After the AHL season was concluded, Kelly was called up to Ottawa in May 2021. He made his NHL debut on May 12, 2021, against the Toronto Maple Leafs in the Senators' final game of the 2020–21 NHL season. He scored on his only shot in the game despite playing 7:32 minutes. Kelly remained with Ottawa following training camp at the beginning of the 2021–22 season, playing as the team's fourth-line center. On October 12, 2021 Kelly signed a two-year contract extension. He was assigned to Belleville on October 24, 2021. He was recalled on November 6 after Tyler Ennis became ill. After playing in his eleventh game with the Senators, he was re-assigned to Belleville on November 28. He served as an alternate captain with Belleville. He played in 22 games with Belleville registering nine points before being recalled by Ottawa on February 8, 2022. He returned to Belleville on February 11. Kelly was brought back up to Ottawa for the fifth time on April 5 after Mathieu Joseph was injured. Kelly had spent the majority of his time in Ottawa on the fourth line, but after being called up, saw some time on Ottawa's top line with Brady Tkachuk and Josh Norris.

Career statistics

References

External links

1999 births
Living people
Belleville Senators players
Camrose Kodiaks players
Canadian ice hockey forwards
Ice hockey people from Alberta
Ottawa Senators players
Prince Albert Raiders players
Undrafted National Hockey League players